Let the Drummer Get Wicked is a mixtape by Travis Barker. It is hosted by DJ Whoo Kid. It was released on February 21, 2011.

Background
This mixtape was released in promotion of his album, Give the Drummer Some.

Track listing

References

2011 mixtape albums
Travis Barker albums
Albums produced by Travis Barker
Albums produced by Dr. Dre
Albums produced by Havoc (musician)
Albums produced by Lex Luger
Albums produced by Pharrell Williams